Riddlesdown Common or Riddlesdown is a 43 hectare area of green space in Kenley, towards the northern end of the North Downs in the London Borough of Croydon. It is owned and maintained by the City of London Corporation, apart from two small areas, one of which is operated by the London Wildlife Trust and the other by Croydon Council. An area of 32 hectares is a biological Site of Special Scientific Interest. The name Riddlesdown also applies to the local district of residential housing.

History
Discoveries of Neolithic stone axes and possible traces of Iron Age fields show that occupation goes back thousands of years. The name Riddlesdown is first recorded in 1331 as Ridelsdoune meaning 'cleared woodland on a hill'. In medieval time Riddlesdown and the neighbouring Kenley Common formed part of the waste land of the manor of Watendone, and the commoners rights included pasture for their livestock and gathering of materials for fuel. In the nineteenth century the coming of the railways increased the value of the land, and the lord of the manor, Edmund Byron, began enclosing the area. One local landowner, William Hall, refused to sell his land to Byron, and in 1877 Hall and his brother brought a case against Byron in the Court of Chancery for encroaching on Common Land. They were successful, William Hall then asked the Corporation of London to purchase the land to preserve it as open space. In 1883 the Corporation bought Riddlesdown and Kenley Common. They became part of the City Commons, seven green spaces in south London managed by the City Corporation of London.

Site of Special Scientific Interest
An area of 32 hectares is the Riddlesdown Site of Special Scientific Interest. It is the largest area of calcareous scrub in Greater London, with a herb-rich chalk grassland. It includes a disused chalk quarry which is not open to the public. It has many mature yew trees, Taxus baccata. It is one of the few places in London with juniper Juniperus communis. There are two nationally rare herbs, early gentian (Gentianella anglica) and round-headed rampion. Invertebrate species include the scarce Roesel's bush-cricket. Several rare orchids can be found within the woodland some of which were thought to be extinct in the area or throughout London.

Wider area
The site forms part of the Riddlesdown to Whyteleafe countryside area, which is managed by wardens working for the City of London, Croydon Council and Tandridge District Council.

Access
There is access from Riddlesdown Road, Tithepit Shaw Lane and Godstone Road.

See also
 List of Sites of Special Scientific Interest in Greater London
 List of parks and open spaces managed by the City of London Corporation
 Croydon parks and open spaces

References

External links

Natural England, Riddlesdown SSSI citation
Natural England, Riddlesdown Unit 1
Natural England, Riddlesdown Unit 2
Natural England, Riddlesdown Unit 3
City of London Corporation, Riddlesdown
City of London Corporation, Map of Riddlesdown Common

Sites of Special Scientific Interest in London
Parks and open spaces in the London Borough of Croydon
London Wildlife Trust
Parks and open spaces of the City of London Corporation